Mexican Dynasties is a television series on the American television network Bravo, which premiered on February 26, 2019.

Overview 
Mexican Dynasties follows three wealthy families in Mexico City and their over-the-top lifestyles. The Allendes, Bessudos, and Madrazos are connected to one another through personal and professional relationships dating back decades.

Cast

The Allende family

Fernando Allende 
Considered the ultimate heartthrob in his earlier years, Fernando has enjoyed an illustrious career as a singer, actor, and artist, and serves as the backbone of his family. He married Mari in the late 1980s and the couple have two sons, Elan and Adan.

Mari Allende 
Puerto Rico-born Mari works as her husband's manager.

Adan Allende 
The younger son of Fernando and Mari, Adan is trying to start a solo career in the music industry and move away from his father's shadow.

Elan Allende 
The elder son of Fernando and Mari, Elan has made a career in commercial real estate but is also trying to make it in the music industry with his wife, Jenny. The couple are in a latin pop duo called Shambayah, which merges "tropical, urban, pop and reggae influences." During season one, Elan is working to fix a strained relationship with his father and brother, caused by his decision to leave the band he and his brother shared.

Jenny Allende Colón 
Jenny is a Puerto Rican singer, TV host, model, and pageant queen, who represented Puerto Rico in Miss World 2009. She and her husband, Elan, have two children, María Valentina and Fernando José. During season one, Jenny tries to solidify her place within the Allende family when she and Elan move to Mexico City; she's often at odds with Fernando and Mari, who never approved of her marrying their son.

The Bessudo family

Raquel Bessudo 
Raquel is a television show host and is considered the “Grand Dame of Beauty” in Mexico. She was married to Leon Bessudo, whose father owned the beverage company Jarritos, for 58 years before his death in 2018.

Doris Bessudo 
Doris is managing her mother's career and is a partner at a Los Angeles-based, female-led public relations firm, Nine Muses. In season one, she returns to Mexico City to help her mother, Raquel, navigate life in the aftermath of her husband's death. Doris is also the cousin of Mauricio Umansky, who is married to Real Housewives of Beverly Hills star Kyle Richards.

The Madrazo family

Oscar Madrazo 
Oscar owns the largest and most prestigious modeling agency in Latin America, which he started when he was 18 years old. He also owns a social media and production house and co-hosts “Qué Madrazo,” an entertainment talk show, with his sister, Paulina. He made headlines when he became the first openly gay man in Latin America to have children through surrogacy.

Paulina Madrazo 
Paulina is an executive at her brother Oscar Madrazo’s modeling agency and co-hosts “Qué Madrazo,” an entertainment talk show in Mexico City, with him.

Episodes

Production 
Bravo reached out to Jaime Dávila, a former development executive at Bravo, with the interest of creating a television series set in Mexico City. After Dávila told them it would be difficult to find "rich Mexicans willing to open up their lives" as the Bravo executives had asked, the network connected his production company with Shed Media, which produces The Real Housewives of New York City, to assemble a cast and a series.

See also
 List of programs broadcast by Bravo

References

External links
 Mexican Dynasties at BravoTV.com
  Mexican Dynasties at IMDb

2019 American television series debuts
Bravo (American TV network) original programming
Television shows filmed in Mexico